{{DISPLAYTITLE:Kappa2 Ceti}}

 Kappa2 Ceti  (κ2 Ceti), is a solitary, yellow-hued star located in the equatorial constellation of Cetus. It is faintly visible to the naked eye with an apparent visual magnitude of 5.66.  Based upon an annual parallax shift of 10.11 mas as seen from Earth, it is located about 320 light years from the Sun.

This is an evolved G-type giant star with a stellar classification of G8 III. It is a red clump star on the horizontal branch, which indicates it is generating energy through helium fusion at its core. The star has 2.46 times the mass of the Sun and has expanded to 8.2 times the Sun's radius. It is radiating 42 times the solar luminosity from its photosphere at an effective temperature of 5,007 K.

References

External links 
http://server7.wikisky.org/starview?object_type=1&object_id=3734

Cetus, Kappa2
Horizontal-branch stars
Cetus (constellation)
Ceti, Kappa2
Durchmusterung objects
Ceti, 97
020791
015619
1007